Mon cœur avait raison is a 2015 double album by Congolese–French singer and rapper Maître Gims. Released on 28 August 2015, the album is divided into Pilule bleue ("blue pill"), containing 15 tracks and Pilule rouge ("red pill"), containing 11.

Genesis 
In parallel with the announcement of his Warano Tour, Maître Gims published videos via social networks with extracts of songs that turned out to be those of his future album. In addition, he announces the release on 20 February 2016 of the seventh video of This is not a clip with Fuck Ramses which could not take place.

Although announced for the month of March, the release of the first single from the album "Est-ce que tu m'aimes?" took place on 28 April on Skyrock. In addition, he announces that the album will be divided into two parts: the Blue Pill which is a part made up of urban pop songs, and the Red Pill which is oriented towards rap. This concept was inspired by the movie The Matrix. Some time later, the first single from The Red Pill titled "Melynda Gates" followed by a clip is released.

Then, Gims unveils the second extract of the Blue Pill called "Laissez passer", the clip of which brings together his family, his father and his brothers.

At the end of July, Maître Gims continues with "Longue vie" (Red Pill) with Lefa which marks his return to the music scene, the clip brings together all the Sexion d'Assaut.

The tracklist and the release date of the album are announced by Maître Gims on social networks: the album will be released on 28 August.

At the end of August, a new single: "Brisé", is available. Subsequently, he released 4 other singles from his double album ("Tu vas me manquer", "Je te pardonne", "ABCD" as well as "Sapés comme jamais"). Then he announced the reissue of his album which will be released on 26 August 2016.

Reception 
The album was well received and after having counted nearly 85,800 records sold for its first week, it was certified platinum. At the end of 2018, more than 700,000 units had been sold in France and 581,000 units had been sold internationally.

Track listing

Pilule bleue

Pilule rouge

Reissue

Charts

Weekly charts

Year-end charts

Certifications

References 

2015 albums
Gims albums
French-language albums